The Treaty of the Danish West Indies, officially the Convention between the United States and Denmark for cession of the Danish West Indies, was a 1916 treaty transferring sovereignty of the Virgin Islands in the Danish West Indies from Denmark to the United States in exchange for a sum of US$25,000,000 in gold ($ million in ). It is one of the most recent permanent expansions of United States territory.

History

Background

Two of the islands had been in Danish possession since the 17th century and St. Croix since 1733. The glory days of the colony had been from around 1750 to 1850 based on transit trade and the production of rum and sugar using African slaves as labor. By the second half of the 19th century the sugar production was embattled by the cultivation of sugar beets, and although the slaves had been emancipated in 1848, the agricultural land and the trade was still controlled by the white population, and the living conditions of the descendants of the slaves were poor. By the early 1850s the islands had become increasingly unprofitable and expensive to govern from Denmark.

At the negotiations for the Treaty of Vienna after the defeat in the Second Schleswig War in 1864, Denmark had tried to use the islands as a trade-in for South Jutland (Schleswig), but the Prussian Government was not interested.

On the eve of the American Civil War, the United States became interested in the islands as the possible location of a Caribbean naval base. After the war ended, October 24, 1867, the Danish parliament, the Rigsdag, ratified a treaty on the sale of two of the islands — St. Thomas and St. John — for a sum of US$7,500,000. However, the United States Senate did not ratify the treaty due to concerns over a number of natural disasters that had struck the islands and a political feud with President Andrew Johnson that eventually led to his impeachment.

Negotiations resumed in 1899 following the unofficial diplomacy of Walter Christmas. On January 24, 1902, Washington signed a convention on the transfer of the islands for a sum of US$5,000,000. The treaty was not approved in the Landsting, one chamber of the Danish legislature, within the allotted time due to obstruction by the opposition. A new treaty was concluded in June 1902, extending the time limit of ratification by one year. One chamber of the Danish parliament — the Folketing — passed the proposal, but in the other chamber — the Landsting — it failed with 32 votes against 32 (with one abstention) on October 22. In particular the conservative party Højre opposed it on the grounds that the treaty did not ensure the local population a vote on the matter, and that it did not grant them US citizenship or freedom from customs duty on the export of sugar to the United States. According to historian Povl Engelstoft, there is no doubt that Council President Johan Henrik Deuntzer was privately against the sale even though his party, the Venstre Reform Party, supported it, and when the Landsting failed to pass the proposal, he made a statement that neither did he see a reason for the cabinet to step down, nor would he dissolve the Landsting or assume responsibility for any further work related to the sale. This brought the process to a halt.

1915–16 negotiations
Labor leader David Hamilton Jackson made a visit to Copenhagen in May 1915. He successfully raised awareness of the growing social desperation on the islands and the need to enter the customs territory of the United States in order for the islands to be able to cope with their economic crisis. After his visit, a majority of the Folketing was convinced that the Danish supremacy of the islands had to end. The First World War had created a new situation: the relations between Germany and the United States were becoming worse as a consequence of Germany's unrestricted submarine warfare, and the Americans were concerned that after an invasion of Denmark the Germans might take control of the islands. This would be unacceptable to the Americans as stated in the Monroe Doctrine. 

The Danish government was convinced that the islands had to be sold for the sake of both the residents and Danish security, and that a transfer would have to be realized before the United States entered the war, so that the transfer would not become a violation of the Danish neutrality. During May 1915, Foreign Minister of Denmark Erik Scavenius contacted the American government with the message that he believed that the islands ought to be sold to the United States and that although he would not make an official proposal, "if the United States gave any encouragement to the consideration of the possibility of such a sale, it might be possible."

On October 29, 1915, United States Secretary of State Robert Lansing managed to reopen the negotiations. The negotiations, which lasted until August 1916, were kept absolutely secret in order to maintain Danish neutrality. Although rumors of the future sale did leak to the press, they were denied categorically by both Scavenius and Minister of Finance Edvard Brandes. Archive materials show that, during these talks, Lansing implied that if an agreement on the sale of the islands was not reached, the U.S. military might occupy the islands to prevent their seizure by Germany.

During 1916, the two sides agreed to a sale price of $25,000,000, and the United States accepted a Danish demand for a declaration stating that they would "not object to the Danish Government extending their political and economic interests to the whole of Greenland". Although it had a claim on northern Greenland based on explorations by Charles Francis Hall and Robert Peary, the United States decided that the purchase was more important, especially because of the nearby Panama Canal. Historian Bo Lidegaard questions the utility of such a declaration, as the country had never disputed Danish sovereignty.

At the time of the purchase, the colony did not include Water Island, which had been sold by the Danish state to the East Asiatic Company, a private shipping company, in 1905. The company eventually sold the island to the United States in 1944, during the German occupation of Denmark.

Ratification

The treaty was signed on August 4, 1916, at the Biltmore Hotel in New York City by Danish Minister Constantin Brun and Secretary of State Robert Lansing. The U.S. Senate approved the treaty on September 7, 1916. A Danish referendum was held on December 14, 1916, and on December 22 the Danish parliament ratified the treaty. U.S. President Woodrow Wilson ratified the treaty on January 16, 1917. Ratifications of the treaty were formally exchanged in Washington, D.C. on January 17, 1917. On January 25, President Wilson issued a proclamation on the treaty, and on March 9, King Christian X of Denmark also issued a proclamation.

On March 31, 1917, in Washington, D.C. a warrant for twenty five million dollars in gold was presented to Danish Minister Constatine Brun by Secretary of State Robert Lansing. Little reaction to the sale occurred among Danes, who saw the West Indies as an investment despite more than two centuries of possession.

Cost

David R. Barker of the University of Iowa stated that the acquisition of the Virgin Islands "is the clearest example of a negative net present
value purchase" among US territorial acquisitions. "Expenses are high, and net revenues have been non-existent", he wrote; because of the Naval Appropriations Act For 1922, all tax revenue goes to the local government.

Notes

References

External links
 Convention between the United States and Denmark for cession of the Danish West Indies , 

Danish West Indies
Danish West Indies
Danish West Indies
Danish West Indies
Danish West Indies
Danish West Indies
Danish West Indies
1916 in international relations
1916 in the Caribbean
1916 in the Danish colonial empire
1916 in the United States
1916 in the United States Virgin Islands
20th century in the Danish West Indies
Danish West Indies
History of the United States Virgin Islands
History of United States expansionism
Danish West Indies
Politics of the United States Virgin Islands
Presidency of Woodrow Wilson
Denmark–United States relations
August 1916 events